This is an Abe Laboriel Jr. discography.

Discography

Discographies of American artists
Rock music discographies